Marquess of Alventos is a hereditary title in the Peerage of Spain, granted in 1761 by Philip V to José de Rojas, veintiquatro of Seville and knight of the Order of Calatrava.

Marquesses of Alventos (1761)

 José de Rojas y Contreras, 1st Marquess of Alventos
 Antonio de Rojas y Prieto, 2nd Marquess of Alventos
 José María de Rojas y Ponce de León, 3rd Marquess of Alventos
 Antonio de Rojas y Aguado, 4th Marquess of Alventos
 Ricardo de Rojas y Porres, 5th Marquess of Alventos
 José María de Rojas y Ezpeleta, 6th Marquess of Alventos
 Narcisa de Rojas y Brieva, 7th Marchioness of Alventos
 Alfonso de Medina y Rojas, 8th Marquess of Alventos
 Manuel de Medina y Echevarría, 9th Marquess of Alventos

See also
Spanish nobility

References

Marquesses of Spain
Lists of Spanish nobility
Noble titles created in 1761